ITT: The Management of Opportunity is a non-fiction book about ITT Corporation by American business writer and historian Robert Sobel. The book was initially published by Times Books in 1982.

Contents
In this book, Sobel concentrates on the history of ITT Corporation, one of the world's largest conglomerates. Back in the 1970s and 80s, the corporation acquired many various businesses—from a financial services companies to the famous Sheraton Hotels and Resorts (in those years known as ITT Sheraton), sometimes doing 20 deals a month.

See also
 Conglomerate discount
 Holding company
 List of conglomerates
 Media conglomerate
 Pure play
 Subsidiary

References

External links
Google books

1982 non-fiction books
Books about companies
Books about multinational companies
Business books
ITT Inc.
Times Books books